In France, a bouillon  is a traditional (late 19th or early 20th century), spacious restaurant that usually serves traditional French cuisine, in particular a bouillon, which has provided the name for this class of restaurants.

When invented, the concept was to serve good quality food quickly, at an affordable price. By repeating the same formula across multiple sites, the founder also effectively invented the chain restaurant; however, the wider idea had no influence (beyond other bouillons) and ultimately it was American chains which revived the idea in France.

Today, the buildings of some bouillons are listed historical monuments.

History 

The first bouillon was opened in 1855 by a butcher, Pierre Louis Duval. He proposed a single dish of meat, and a bouillon (soup/stock) to the workers of the market halls. In 1900, nearly two hundred and fifty bouillons could be found in Paris. They became the first popular chain of restaurants. Some other more "upper-class" bouillons offered a reading room or some entertainment.

Meanwhile, Art Nouveau spread through Europe. The various World's Fairs in Paris 1878, 1889, and 1900, accelerated its influence, and restaurants followed the trend.

In 1896, Bouillon Chartier was opened by brothers Frédéric and Camille Chartier on Rue du Faubourg Montmartre. 
 
In 1903, Bouillon Gandon-Duval opened in an old restaurant converted by the owner and architect, Edouard Fournier.

In 1904, another bouillon with luxurious Art Nouveau decoration was opened on Boulevard Saint-Germain. The architect was Jean-Marie Bouvier. Today, it houses Brasserie Vagenende, which is not a bouillon.

With Louis Trezel Edouard Chartier opened two further Bouillons Chartier in 1906: the Grand Bouillon Camille Chartier on Rue Racine and the Bouillon Edouard Chartier on Boulevard Montparnasse. These restaurants were created in the Art Nouveau style: carved wood and ceramics, with mirrors and painted glass details.

Nowadays, only a few authentic bouillons remain, such as the one of the Faubourg-Montmartre and in particular the one in Rue Racine, which has the most baroque style of Art Nouveau.

Until 1926, Camille Chartier remained the owner. After being called Bouillon Ollé and Joussot, it was Mme. Launois who kept the restaurant until 1956. The following purchaser sold the goodwill to the University of Paris, which opened a restaurant there for the staff of the Sorbonne from 1962 until 1993. The major part of the decoration survived but the restaurant did not benefit from the special care allotted to luxurious restaurants.

The complete renovation of Bouillon Racine took place in 1996, thanks to the Compagnons du Tour de France. It required artisans and experts who had the skills of techniques nearly lost. Bevelled mirrors, painted opalines, stained glass, carved woodworks, marble mosaics and gold-leaf lettering provide the public with the pleasure of an opulent space, as much by its beauty as its conviviality. It was subsequently classified as a historic building.

Since 2017, the Parisian bouillon has seen a resurgence. Bouillon Chartier Montparnasse, which had been lately functioning as a brasserie named Montparnasse 1900, reprised its original vocation (and name) in 2019. Two new bouillons have been launched by the Moussié brothers, Pierre and Guillaume: Bouillon Pigalle (opened in 2017 on Boulevard Clichy) and Bouillon République (opened in 2021 in the former home of the venerable brasserie, Chez Jenny).

Popular culture
The novel A Killer at Sorbonne by René Reouven was inspired by the characters and customers at Bouillon Racine. In this context, the novelist recalls the assassination of Symon Petliura by Sholom Schwartzbard in 1926 which took place at the exit of Bouillon Camille Chartier (i.e. Bouillon Racine).
 In 1939, Fernandel sings of Chez Chartier in the song "Félicie aussi" by Albert Willemetz:

 In Les Beaux Quartiers by Louis Aragon, Chez Chartier is mentioned as the restaurant in which young Edmond Barbentane lunches regularly.
 The setting of the closing scene of La Chose publique by Mathieu Amalric is at Chez Chartier.

See also 
 Chez Chartier

Videos 
 Chartier restaurant Paris (French)

Books 
 Matthieu Flory/Clémentine Forissier: Restaurants, brasseries et bistrots parisiens. Editions Ereme, Paris 2007, pp. 82–85, 
 Jean Colson/Marie-Christine Lauroa (Eds.): Dictionnaire des monuments de Paris. Editions Hervas, Paris 2003,

References

External links 
  Restaurant Chartier
 Bouillon Racine
 Le Grand Colbert
 Restaurant le Court-Bouillon
 Au Bouillon Normand
 Bouillon Bilk
 Restaurant Le Vagenende

Restaurants in Paris
Restaurants by type